The Federal Transit Administration (FTA) is an agency within the United States Department of Transportation (DOT) that provides financial and technical assistance to local public transportation systems. The FTA is one of ten modal administrations within the DOT. Headed by an Administrator who is appointed by the President of the United States, the FTA functions through Washington, D.C headquarters office and ten regional offices which assist transit agencies in all states, the District of Columbia, and the territories.  Until 1991, it was known as the Urban Mass Transportation Administration (UMTA).

Public transportation includes buses, subways, light rail, commuter rail, monorail, passenger ferry boats, trolleys, inclined railways, and people movers. The federal government, through the FTA, provides financial assistance to develop new transit systems and improve, maintain, and operate existing systems. The FTA oversees grants to state and local transit providers, primarily through its ten regional offices. These providers are responsible for managing their programs in accordance with federal requirements, and the FTA is responsible for ensuring that grantees follow federal mandates along with statutory and administrative requirements.

History
In 1962, President John F. Kennedy sent a major transportation message to the U.S. Congress. It called for the establishment of a program of federal capital assistance for mass transportation. Said President Kennedy: "To conserve and enhance values in existing urban areas is essential. But at least as important are steps to promote economic efficiency and livability in areas of future development. Our national welfare therefore requires the provision of good urban transportation, with the properly balanced use of private vehicles and modern mass transport to help shape as well as serve urban growth."

President Lyndon B. Johnson signed the Urban Mass Transportation Act of 1964 into law, which passed the House by a vote of 212-129 and cleared the Senate 52–41, creating the Urban Mass Transportation Administration. The agency was charged with providing federal assistance for mass transit projects, including an initial $375 million in capital assistance over three years as mandated by the act.  In 1991, the agency was renamed the Federal Transit Administration.

Administrators
The current Administrator is Nuria I. Fernandez, having assumed the post in 2021 as Acting Administrator, before being subsequently confirmed to the position by the Senate in June of 2021. Below is a list of past administrators.

Notable programs

Metropolitan & Statewide Planning
Urbanized Formula Funding
Clean Fuels Grant Program
Major Capital Investments
Fixed Guideway Modernization
Transportation for Elderly Persons and Persons with Disabilities
Formula Grants for Other than Urbanized Areas
Public Transportation on Indian Reservations
Rural Transit Assistance Program
Transit Cooperative Research Program
National Research & Technology Program
Job Access and Reverse Commute Program
New Freedom Program
Bus and Bus Facilities
Paul S. Sarbanes Transit in Parks Program
Alternatives Analysis
University Transportation Centers Program
Over-the-Road Bus Program
BUILD (Better Utilizing Investments to Leverage Development), formerly TIGER (Transit Investment Generating Economic Recovery)
Transit Investments for Greenhouse Gas and Energy Reduction (TIGGER) Program
Veterans Transportation and Community Living Initiative Capital Grants Program

References

External links
 
 American Recovery & Reinvestment Act
 Federal Transit Administration in the Federal Register

Public transportation in the United States
Government agencies established in 1964
United States Department of Transportation agencies
Transit